The Lerche–Newberger, or Newberger, sum rule, discovered by B. S. Newberger in 1982, finds the sum of certain infinite series involving Bessel functions Jα of the first kind. 
It states that if μ is any non-integer complex number, and Re(α + β) > −1, then

Newberger's formula generalizes a formula of this type proven by Lerche in 1966; Newberger discovered it independently. Lerche's formula has γ =1; both extend a standard rule for the summation of Bessel functions, and are useful in plasma physics.

References

Special functions
Mathematical identities